145th Street may refer to:

New York 
145th Street (Manhattan), a street in Manhattan, New York City
145th Street (IRT Broadway – Seventh Avenue Line), a station at Broadway serving the  train
145th Street (IND Eighth Avenue Line), a station at Saint Nicholas Avenue serving the  trains
145th Street (IRT Lenox Avenue Line), a station at Lenox Avenue serving the  train
145th Street (IRT Ninth Avenue Line), a demolished Interborough Rapid Transit Company station
145th Street Bridge, a bridge over the Harlem River
145th Street Shuttle, a former service of the Interborough Rapid Transit Company and New York City Subway

Washington 
Washington State Route 523, which is named 145th Street, and forms part of the northern border of Seattle
Shoreline South/148th station, a light rail station in Shoreline, Washington